Vasya may refer to:
 Vasya (crater), a tiny crater on the Moon
 Vasya (film), 2002 American documentary film about artist Vasily Sitnikov
 Vassya Bankova (Vasya Bankova; born 1954), a Bulgarian chemist

See also 
 , a masculine given name
 Vasyanovich, a surname
 Vasin, a surname derived from Vasya